Frank Malcolm Owen (December 23, 1879 – November 24, 1942) was a pitcher in Major League Baseball who played eight seasons with the Detroit Tigers and Chicago White Sox.

Born in Ypsilanti, Michigan (and nicknamed "Yip" for it), he pitched the final six innings of Game 2 of the 1906 World Series, replacing Doc White. In 194 career games, Owen had an 82–67 won-loss record with a 2.55 ERA.

Owen was the first American League pitcher to pitch complete game wins in both games of a doubleheader, winning against the St. Louis Browns on July 1, 1905. Owen was mistakenly referred to as "Billy Owen" in the 1906 version of the "Fan Craze" board game, released by the Fan Craze Co of Cincinnati.

In 1904, as a member of the White Sox, in 315 innings of work, he handled 151 chances (21 PO, 130 A) without an error and also executed 8 double plays.

References

External links

1879 births
1942 deaths
Chicago White Sox players
Detroit Tigers players
Major League Baseball pitchers
Baseball players from Michigan
Sportspeople from Ypsilanti, Michigan
Detroit Tigers (Western League) players
Wilkes-Barre Coal Barons players
Omaha Indians players
Toledo Mud Hens players
Kansas City Blues (baseball) players